The 1987 People's Cars Scottish Professional Championship was a professional non-ranking snooker tournament, which took place in February 1987 in Glasgow, Scotland.

Stephen Hendry retained the title by beating Jim Donnelly 10–7 in the final.

Main draw

References

Scottish Professional Championship
Scottish Professional Championship
Scottish Professional Championship
Scottish Professional Championship
Sports competitions in Glasgow